Hasrat Ullah Sherwani is an Indian politician and a member of the Fifteenth Legislative Assembly of Uttar Pradesh in India. He represented the Kasganj constituency of Uttar Pradesh  election in 2007 till 2012.

Formation of Kasganj District
On April 17, 2008, under the leadership of Hasrat as the MLA from Kasganj, it was demanded to make Kasganj a separate district. Today, Kasganj is the 71st district of Uttar Pradesh.

Public life
Sherwani was part of the peace meeting to deflate the public unrest of Kasganj on 26 January, 2018.

References

External links
 
 
https://myneta.info/uttarpradesh2017/candidate.php?candidate_id=33
https://m.patrika.com/tags/hasrat-ullah-sherwani/

1957 births
Living people
People from Etah district
Samajwadi Party politicians from Uttar Pradesh